Arabis sadina is a species of flowering plant in the family Brassicaceae. It is endemic to Portugal.

Distribution and habitat
Arabis sadina is endemic to the centre-west of Portugal, occurring in the districts of Leiria, Santarém, Lisbon, Setúbal and Évora. It lives in glades of forests and basophil scrub in coastal cliffs and hills close to the sea; on rocky outcrops or stony, limestone soils and open areas of oak stands (Quercus rotundifolia, Quercus suber, Quercus faginea). Main populations occur in Serras de Aire e Candeeiros, Serra de Montejunto and Serra da Arrábida.

References

sadina
Endemic flora of Portugal
Endemic flora of the Iberian Peninsula
Plants described in 1913